18 Essential Songs is a collection of songs recorded throughout Janis Joplin's career released in 1995 by Columbia Records.  It included songs from her solo career as well as with Big Brother & the Holding Company.  The Recording Industry Association of America (RIAA) certified it as gold on April 12, 1999.

Reception

AllMusic critic William Ruhlmann awarded the album 4.5 out of five stars and noted:

Track listing

Personnel
Janis Joplin – lead vocal, acoustic guitar (on "Me and Bobby McGee"), chorus voices
James Gurley, John Till, Jorma Kaukonen, Michael Bloomfield – guitars
Sam Andrew – guitars, backing vocals
Gabriel Mekler, Richard Kermode – keyboards
Ken Pearson – organ
Richard Bell – piano
Cornelius "Snooky" Flowers – baritone sax, backing vocals
Terry Clements – tenor sax
Luis Gasca – trumpet
Brad Campbell, Peter Albin – bass
Clark Pierson, Dave Getz, Lonnie Castille, Maury Baker, Roy Markowitz – drums, percussion
Sandra Crouch – tambourine
Bobbye Hall – conga/bongos
Full Tilt Boogie Band, Vince Mitchell, Phil Badella, John Cooke - chorus voices
Songs produced by Jorma Kaukonen, Bob Shad, John Phillips, Lou Adler, Elliot Mazer, Gabriel Mekler, Paul A. Rothchild
"Tell Mama" remixed by Elliot Mazer

Sales certifications

References

External links

1995 compilation albums
Janis Joplin compilation albums
Albums produced by Bob Irwin
Compilation albums published posthumously